Nangis is a railway station in Nangis, Île-de-France, France. The station is located on the Paris Est–Mulhouse railway line. The station is served by TER (local) services operated by SNCF: Transilien line P (Paris–Longueville–Provins).

Gallery

External links

 
Transilien network map
Transilien website

Railway stations in Seine-et-Marne
Railway stations in France opened in 1857